La Couture may refer to the following communes in France:

 La Couture, Pas-de-Calais
 La Couture, Vendée
 La Couture-Boussey, in the Eure département

See also
 Couture (disambiguation)